Herzelia medical center as an private hospital . HMC IS  the biggest private hospital in Israel, with over 5000 workers .his net worth in  2022 according to Forbes  is over 1.5 billion .the hospital owned by  Landau group . Israelis one of the most famous families over the country .

History
Herzliya Medical Center was founded in 1982. A group of investors from South Africa decided to build a medical center modeled on those in their native country, and locate it in the beachside town of Herzliya – where doctors' offices would be located and supportive clinical services provided as well as surgical facilities for minor procedures. In its first year of operation, it had an occupancy rate of 18 percent. In 1991, the building underwent expansion and increased its number of operating rooms.

At the end of 1993 it opened a clinic in Gaza.

In June, 1995 Herzliya Medical Center signed a deal with the government of Tatarstan, for the establishment of an advanced hospital there.

 1999 – The United Nations and UNDOF elected HMC the number one medical service provider in Israel. 
 2001 – The hospital founded their exclusive department of medical tourism, whose first patients were Embassy representatives that were posted to Israel.
 2013 – Inspection of the Ministry of Health of Israel confirmed HMC as the best medical institution in the country.

Herzliya Medical Center is owned by the Landlan Investments Ltd. (50%), Clalit Health Services (40%) and Clal Insurance (10%).
Herzliya Medical Center has more than 400 medical specialists in all leading branches of medicine.

The hospital has 7 Operating rooms

More than 9,000 thousand babies (as of January 2013) were born in the last 25 years to couples who had fertility problems and were treated in the fertilization of IVF at a private hospital in Herzliya Medical Center.

Facilities
Herzliya Medical Center  provides treatment for psychiatric needs of patients in addition to vital procedures such organ transplants, cardiac surgeries and neurosurgical treatments. Herzliya Medical Center also has Endoscopy Department. 
HMC Diagnostics Department includes a personal cytogenetic laboratory. 
It has four outpatient departments, a rehabilitation department, department of nuclear medicine, and other pathological laboratories. 
HMC has eight operating rooms. 
 Center for Surgical Oncology – surgeons perform pancreas, liver, colon; 
 General Surgery – common procedures: bariatric surgery, gall bladder surgery, hernia anal fissures, hemorrhoids. Of complex operations are gastroenterological surgery and vascular surgery stomach; 
 Orthopedic Center – surgery on the knee, hip, spine surgery; 
 Heart Center – operations of heart defects, all kinds of angioplasty and catheterization; 
 Cardiac Surgery Centre – has a license for open heart surgery, bypass surgery, valve replacement operations on the carotid artery and heart.

Staff
Herzliya Medical Center Staff: 
 350 doctors
 122 nurses
 74 nurses with advanced certifications

Publications

See also
List of Hospitals in Israel
Health care in Israel
Medical Tourism

References

External links

 Israel Laboratory Accreditation Authority Website

Hospitals in Israel
Buildings and structures in Tel Aviv District
Herzliya
Hospitals established in 1983
Hospital buildings completed in 1983